K-90 or K90 may refer to:
 K-90 (Kansas highway), a highway in Kansas
 K-90, a rating for hills indicating a construction point of 90
 INS Prachand (K90), a former Indian Navy ship